Mara Maru is a 1952 noir-influenced action film directed by Gordon Douglas. It stars Errol Flynn and Ruth Roman.

It was the last movie Flynn made for Warner Bros where he had started out in Hollywood in 1935. However he did go on to appear in a British film The Master of Ballantrae that was released by Warners, and return to make Too Much, Too Soon where he played his friend John Barrymore.

Plot summary
Gregory Mason (Errol Flynn) and Andy Callahan (Richard Webb) are partners in a post-World War II salvage business in Manila. Callahan is murdered after some drunken talk about sunken treasure. Mason is suspected by Lt. Zuenon of the local police because of Callahan's public threat to kill Mason made earlier that day in a bar and his intense jealousy toward Mason over a relationship Mason had had with Callahan's wife, Stella (Ruth Roman), before the couple were married.  Stella had remained in love with Mason, but he had respected the union.

Mason is arrested but released after Steven Ranier (Paul Picerni), a private investigator who had been working for Callahan, comes forward and clears him, saying he witnessed Callahan's murder. Mason hires him, both for protection from whoever had killed Callahan and help finding his partner's killer.

Ranier introduces Mason to Brock Benedict (Raymond Burr), a prosperous local tropical fish dealer who wants Mason to find and recover a reputed million dollars worth the diamonds that had gone down off the Philippine coast during the War.  Benedict has discovered it had been aboard a PT boat Mason had commanded, with Callahan serving as his executive officer. Benedict offers to split the proceeds equally with Mason and Stella, whom he is romantically pursuing.

Benedict outfits an oceangoing craft suitable for salvage work, the "Mara Maru", persuading Mason to join him. Both Ranier and Stella coming along, with Stella appearing to be playing both sides against the middle until she discovers Benedict is planning to kill Mason as soon as the treasure is found. Still carrying a torch, she tells Mason this and begs him again to give up the expedition and return with her to a normal life in the United States; once again he insists on continuing.

Mason finds the box containing the treasure and brings it aboard.  It turns out to be a diamond encrusted crucifix from a Catholic cathedral in Manila that has played a significant role in the movie, both spiritual and as part of the mystery of the trail of murders leading towards the treasure.  Benedict seizes it, and he and Ranier, who have been collaborating all along, agree to throw Mason overboard.  Mason announces he has smashed the ship's compass, forcing the pair to relent.

A storm hits and the three men fight over the crucifix while Mason's dive assistant Manuelo beaches the ship at his direction. Mason wrests it, and he, Stella, and Manuelo flee the ship, pursued by the others.  Benedict fatally shoots the mercenary Ranier, and is joined by his bodyguard in chasing the threesome through the jungle.  In a confrontation between Mason and Manuelo over the religious artifact, Mason's greed causes him to beat the young man when the devout Catholic insists the cross be returned.  When Stella upbraids Mason for his actions, Manuelo disappears with the icon. Exhausted from his flight, he is caught near the church steps by Senor Ortega, the brother of the man aboard the PT boat who had originally taken the cross for safekeeping from the invading Japanese. The next morning Mason appears at the church and wrests the cross from Ortega, shortly pursued by Benedict and his henchman. Ortega begs Mason to return the cross, and is slain by Benedict seeking hold off the assailants. Mason and Benedict have a brutal hand-to-hand showdown, with Mason prevailing.  Police arrive to round up Benedict and his gunsel.  With the prospect of a reunion with Stella and return to the States at hand, he hands the cross over to Manuelo and he and Stella are united.

Cast
 Errol Flynn as Gregory Mason
 Ruth Roman as Stella Callahan
 Raymond Burr as Brock Benedict
 Paul Picerni as Steven Ranier
 Richard Webb as Andy Callahan
 Dan Seymour as Lt. Zuenon
 Georges Renavent as Ortega (as George Renavent)
 Robert Cabal as Manuelo
 Henry Marco as Perol

Production

Development
Warner Bros announced in January 1950 that they had bought the film's story from Philip Yordan, Sidney Harmon and Hollister Noble. Ivan Goff and Ben Roberts were originally reported as working on the script, which was described as about five war veterans who buy a Japanese war boat and set about salvaging a sunken war vessel. Everett Freeman was assigned to produce. In July 1950 Warners announced it for the coming year.

In May of the following year David Weisbart was announced as producer. In September, Warners said that Errol Flynn would star and Gordon Douglas would direct Richard Nash had written the script.

Ruth Roman and Raymond Burr were brought on board to support Flynn. (Burr's weight had gone down from 300 to 185 pounds.)

Flynn made the film after an extensive period of travelling.

Shooting
The film was shot at Warner Bros and on location at Newport Harbor, Balboa Island, Los Angeles harbor, Catalina Island and the San Fernando Mission (doubling for a Manila Cathedral).

Director Gordon Douglas later recalled Flynn "was great up until three o'clock in the afternoon. Shooting a scene about 2:30 he'd be fine.I'd go to his dressing room and we'd talk and he'd have what I thought was a glass of water. It was straight up gin or water. Then he'd gone on set and be stoned. He'd start hamming it up. I'd yell 'Cut' and tell him 'You're really eating scenery, man.' He'd say 'No, I was fine.' I'd have the shot printed early and the next morning he'd be horrified when he saw the rushes. 'Get rid of that film!' he'd say. Errol was a nice person but unfortunately a terrible drinker. Believe me he would have died at twenty two if he'd done all the things he was credited for doing."

Reception

Critical
According to The New York Times

The gobbledegookish title of Warner's Mara Maru is not the only obscure and unexciting thing about this stale adventure film. Its wholly improbable build-up of a criss-cross of rivalries ... is bleakly confused and grossly tiresome, and when the action does finally get around to the business of diving for the treasure it is hackneyed and cheaply emotionalized. Even Errol Flynn and Ruth Roman as the working stars in its cast give the impression of being bored and indifferent toward it all.

The Los Angeles Times said that "while its scenes of physical action are scarcely original ... they keep one's eyes on the screen with a fair amount of absorption. What ails the overall production is that its performers talk too darn much."

The Chicago Daily Tribune called it a "preposterous affair" with "a boringly complicated plot ... poor."

Filmink later wrote that the film was a "soggy melodrama" which was "a throwback to the sort of thing Humphrey Bogart used to make – a tale of double-crossing and dirty dealings in an exotic port"  with "too much talk, flabby handling, and a star off form."

References

External links
 
 
 
 

1952 films
1952 adventure films
American adventure films
Films directed by Gordon Douglas
Films scored by Max Steiner
Films set in the Philippines
Treasure hunt films
Underwater action films
American black-and-white films
1950s English-language films
1950s American films